High Society is a 2015 South Korean television series starring Uee, Sung Joon, Park Hyung-sik and Lim Ji-yeon. It aired on SBS from June 8 to July 28, 2015 on Mondays and Tuesdays at 21:55 (KST) time slot for 16 episodes.

Synopsis
Jang Yoon-ha (Uee) is the youngest daughter of a chaebol family. Her family is a mess. Hated by her mother, she wants to live a normal life like a normal person. She is arranged to marry a young chaebol Yoo Chang-soo (Park Hyung-sik). She hides her identity and works as a part-time sales woman  in a supermarket and befriends with Lee Ji-yi (Lim Ji-yeon) who wants to marry a rich man and starts dreaming about it.  Lee Ji-yi has a crush on Choi Joon-gi (Sung Joon), a brilliant and hard-working friend of Yoo Chang-soo, who comes from a poor family and wants to become rich by marrying a rich girl. Joon-gi catches Yoon-ha's attention and he proposes to her. Yoo Chang-soo flirts with Lee Ji-yi and they become a couple. Yoon-ha starts a relationship with Joon-gi and it goes well. Yoon-ha and her brother who is the only hope of the top management of the company, goes to Mexico in flight and she departed early. Before reaching Mexico, the flight crashes and her brother also dies. Yoon-ha's mother blames Yoon-ha for her son's death and starts crying and drinking continuously. Joon-gi secretly released Yoon-ha's photo in public without her knowledge and revealed she is an heiress. Yoon-ha becomes a celebrity. Yoon-ha's brother transferred all of his shares to Yoon-ha. One day, Yoon-ha visits Joon-gi's house. She meets his mother and unknowingly she shows Yoon-ha's childhood photo in Joon-gi's drawer. Heartbroken Yoon-ha leaves his house angrily, she decides to join in the company for cosmetics department. Yoon-ha's sister who would do anything to have control over the company. On the other hand, Yoo Chang-soo and Lee Ji-yi relationship is shaken by Chang-soo's mother.
        
She wants to break their relationship and to marry Yoon-ha. Choi Joon-gi realises his love for Yoon-ha and wants to reconcile with her. Yoon-ha uses her popularity to make a huge profit in the cosmetics department and becomes a higher authority in the company. Later, Yoon-ha unites with Joon-gi. Yoon-ha discovers her brother's secret documents filed against her sister about cosmetics ingredients trades in the company.
       
At last it is revealed that Yoon-ha's brother is alive and he comes back to the company. Choi Joon-gi quits his job. Yoo Chang-soo becomes stressed and drinks continuously which makes his mother unite him with Lee Ji-yi. Finally, Yoon-ha's sister is thrown out of the company. Joon-ki proposes to Yoon-ha. Lee Ji-yi becomes pregnant with Yoo Chang-soo's child.

Cast

Main
 Uee as Jang Yoon-ha
The youngest daughter of a chaebol family. She took part-time jobs in order to handle her family-induced stress. She does not let people get close to her because those people often hurt or always leave her, but she falls in love with Joon-ki.
 Sung Joon as Choi Joon-ki
He grew up in poverty and since a young age, has worked hard to earn his high-ranking position. He initially dates Yoon-ha to gain powers, but eventually his feelings become real.
 Park Hyung-sik as Yoo Chang-soo
He is also a chaebol, and Joon-ki's boss. He falls for Yoon-ha's best friend Ji-yi, due to the fact that she overlooked his wealth and status. He doesn't like being used by people he considers allies.
 Lim Ji-yeon as Lee Ji-yi
She is Yoon-ha's best friend and Chang-soo's girlfriend. At first she didn't know about Yoon-ha's real identity and had a crush on Joon-ki. She had imagined chaebols to be people who led an easy life and got whatever they want; those are the reasons why she refused to date Chang-soo at first. But his earnest affection for her made her change her mind.

Supporting
 Yoon Joo-sang as Jang Won-sik
Yoon-ha's father.
 Go Doo-shim as Min Hye-soo
Yoon-ha's mother.
 Lee Sang-woo as Jang Kyung-joon
Yoon-ha's older brother. He was very caring and protective of Yoon-ha, her only ally in the family. Kyung-joon's boat sank off the coast of Mexico, and he is presumed dead.
 Yoon Ji-hye as Jang Ye-won
Yoon-ha's eldest sister. She will do anything to succeed.
 Yoo So-young as Jang So-hyun
Yoon-ha's second oldest sister. She is jealous of Yoon-ha because their parents let her do whatever she wants; however, Yoon-ha only wants to be loved by her parents. So-hyun is vain and very high maintenance.
 Bang Eun-hee as Kim Seo-ra
Won-sik's mistress.
 Nam Myung-ryul as Choi Young-ho
Joon-ki's father.
 Yang Hee-kyung as Lee Min-sook
Joon-ki's mother, who works as Seo-ra's housekeeper.
 Choi Yong-min as Butler Hong
A longtime employee of the Jang family.

Production
 Its early working titles were Chaebol's Daughter and True Romance.
 Screenwriter Ha Myung-hee and director Choi Young-hoon previously worked together on One Warm Word (2013).

Ratings
In this table,  represent the lowest ratings and  represent the highest ratings.

Awards and nominations

Adaptation
A Turkish adaptation titled Yüksek Sosyete was produced by Burak Sağyaşar and aired by Star TV for 26 episodes from June 16 to December 24, 2016. It starred Engin Öztürk as working-class man Kerem Özkan and Hazar Ergüçlü as rich woman Cansu Koran.

References

External links
  
 

Korean-language television shows
2015 South Korean television series debuts
2015 South Korean television series endings
Seoul Broadcasting System television dramas
South Korean romance television series
South Korean melodrama television series
Television series by HB Entertainment